Rangitikei College, formerly known as Marton District High School, is a state secondary coeducational school located in Marton, Rangitikei District, New Zealand. It is located towards the east of the town centre on 24 Bredins Line.

The school provides education for students in years 9–13.

History
Since late 2015 Rangitikei College's principal is Tony Booker, who formerly had been the deputy principal of Nga Tawa Diocesan School and St Peter's College, Palmerston North. Until 2015 the principal was Karene Biggs. Prime Minister John Key visited the school in September 2015, along with Rangitikei MP Ian McKelvie, and gave a speech encouraging students to have confidence in their abilities and to follow their goals.

In 2016 the school introduced an "Inspire Programme" to provide customised learning and mentoring to the most motivated students.

Notable alumnae
Edward Gordon, Member of Parliament
Neil Thimbleby, All Black and Hawke's Bay rugby representative

See also
List of schools in Manawatu-Wanganui

References

External links
Rangitikei College's website

Secondary schools in Manawatū-Whanganui
Rangitikei District